Buntong (Jawi: بونتوڠ; , Tamil: புந்தோங்) is a suburb of Ipoh, Perak, Malaysia.

References

 

Kinta District
Populated places in Perak